Saint Euphrasia (also, Eupraxia) (380 – March 13, 410) was a Constantinopolitan nun who was venerated after her death as a saint for her piety and example of charity.

Life
Euphrasia was the only daughter of Antigonus—a nobleman of the court of Emperor Theodosius I, to whom he was related—and of Euphrasia, his wife. When Antigonus died, his widow and young daughter withdrew together to Egypt, near a monastery of one hundred and thirty nuns.  This was less than a century since St. Anthony had established his first monastery, but monasticism in that time had spread with incredible speed.

At the age of seven, Euphrasia begged to take vows and become a nun at the monastery. When her mother presented the child to the abbess, Euphrasia took up an image of Christ and kissed it, saying, "By vow I consecrate myself to Christ." Her mother replied, "Lord Jesus Christ, receive this child under your special protection. You alone doth she love and seek: to you doth she recommend herself." Soon after, Euphrasia's mother became ill and died.

Hearing of her mother's death, the Emperor Theodosius I sent for Euphrasia, whom he had promised in marriage to a young senator. She responded with a letter to the Emperor declining the offer to marry; instead, she requested that her estate be sold and divided among the poor, and that her slaves be manumitted. The emperor did as she requested shortly before his death in 395.

Another version of her biography states that Euphrasia was raised in the court of Theodosius, and that her mother joined the monastery; Euphrasia joined her as a child. The same version says that it was Theodosius' successor, Arcadius, that commanded her to marry the senator, but she was likewise permitted to remain a nun and give away her property.

Euphrasia was known for her humility, meekness, and charity; her abbess often advised her to perform manual labor when she was burdened with temptations. As a part of these labors, she often carried heavy stones from one place to another—once she did so for thirty days at one time. Euphrasia died in the year 410 at the age of thirty.

Veneration

Euphrasia was said to perform miracles before and after her death. For example, she is said to have healed a deaf, dumb and crippled child, and she delivered a woman from possession by the devil. Moreover, before she died, the abbess of Euphrasia's monastery reported having had a vision of Euphrasia transported to God's throne, surrounded by angels. After her death, she was venerated as a saint. In Western Christianity, her feast day is July 24, according to the Roman Martyrology reformed after the Second Vatican Council; in the Eastern churches, her veneration is celebrated on July 25.

References

External links
 EWTN Library: St. Euphrasia, Virgin
 Catholic Encyclopedia: St. Euphrasia''
 Lives of the Saints, March 13: Saint Euphrasia
 St. Euphrasia Hagiography 

380 births
410 deaths
5th-century Christian saints
Saints from Constantinople